The Society of Saint Paul abbreviated SSP and also known as the Paulines, is a Catholic clerical religious congregation of Pontifical Right for men founded on 20 August 1914 at Alba, Piedmont in Italy by Giacomo Alberione and officially approved by the Holy See on 27 June 1949. Its members add the nominal letters S.S.P. after their names to indicate membership in the Congregation.

Its members are known as the Paulines—a name also applied to the much older Order of Saint Paul the First Hermit. Faithful to the mission assigned them by their founder, they communicate the  Christian message with the use of all means that technology puts at the disposition of modern man. They are present in 30 countries around the world and are active in several fields: editorial and bookstores, journalism, cinematography, television, radio, audiovisual, multimedia, telematics; centres of studies, research, formation, animation.

The society is one of ten religious and lay institutes founded by the priest the Blessed Giacomo Alberione, who was proclaimed   Blessed by  Pope John Paul II on 20 December 2002.

See also 

 Order of Saint Paul the First Hermit
 Daughters of St. Paul  
 Pauline Family  
 Paulist Fathers, separate order  
 Paulists, separate orders
 Nippon Cultural Broadcasting (Founded by Society of Saint Paul)

References

External links
Society of St. Paul, on Daughters of St. Paul website
Society of St Paul website
Society of St Paul Institute of Communication Education

Catholic orders and societies
Christian organizations established in 1914
Catholic religious institutes established in the 20th century